The Sanremo Music Festival 2005 was the 55th annual Sanremo Music Festival, held at the Teatro Ariston in Sanremo, province of Imperia, between 1 and 5 March 2005 and broadcast by Rai 1.

The show was presented by Paolo Bonolis, supported by  Antonella Clerici and Federica Felini. The same Bonolis, together with Gianmarco Mazzi, served as the artistic director. 

According to the rules of this edition, the participants were divided into five categories (Men, Women, Groups, Classic and Newcomers), with only three entries for each category acceding to the finals and with the winners of each category eventually competing for the first place. The winner of the main competition was Francesco Renga with the song "Angelo". Nicola Arigliano won the critics prize with the song "Colpevole".
 
In addition to musical guests, the guests of this edition also included Will Smith, Hugh Grant, Mike Tyson, Christian De Sica.

Participants and results

Men

Women

Groups

Classic

Newcomers

Musical guests

References 

Sanremo Music Festival by year
2005 in Italian music
2005 music festivals
2005 in Italian television